"Take a Chance on Me" is a song by ABBA.

Take a Chance on Me may also refer to:

 "Take a Chance on Me" (JLS song), 2011
 Take a Chance on Me (novel), a book in the Gossip Girl series
 "Take a Chance on Me", a song from the 2005 musical Little Women

See also 
 Take a Chance (disambiguation)